Fabian Cavadias (born 4 September 2001) is a German professional footballer who plays as a defender for Schweinfurt 05 on loan from the  club FC Ingolstadt.

References

External links

2001 births
Living people
German footballers
People from Munich (district)
Sportspeople from Upper Bavaria
Footballers from Bavaria
Association football defenders
SV Heimstetten players
FC Bayern Munich footballers
SpVgg Unterhaching players
FC Ingolstadt 04 players
FC Ingolstadt 04 II players
1. FC Schweinfurt 05 players
2. Bundesliga players
Regionalliga players
Oberliga (football) players